Robert Plonsey (July 17, 1924 – March 14, 2015) was the Pfizer-Pratt University Professor Emeritus of Biomedical Engineering at Duke University. He is noted for his work on bioelectricity.

Education

Plonsey was born in New York City in 1924. He received the B.E.E. degree in electrical engineering from the Cooper Union School of Engineering in New York in 1943, and the M.E.E degree from New York University in 1948.

He obtained his PhD from the University of California, Berkeley in 1957. In addition, he completed the first year and a half of the MD curriculum and the Case Western Reserve University School of Medicine (1969–1972).

Career

Plonsey was a professor at Case Western Reserve University from 1968–1983, including a term as chair of the Department of Biomedical Engineering (1976–1980).  In 1983, he moved to Duke University. He was a fellow of the American Association for the Advancement of Science and was elected as a member of the National Academy of Engineering in 1986 for "the application of electromagnetic field theory to biology, and for distinguished leadership in the emerging profession of biomedical engineering." He retired from Duke in 1996 as the Pfizer Inc./Edmund T. Pratt Jr. University Professor Emeritus of Biomedical Engineering.

Research

Plonsey's research centered on bioelectric phenomena, including the electrical activity of nerves and muscle. With his student John Clark, he derived a mathematical relationship between the transmembrane potential and the extracellular potential produced by a propagating action potential in a nerve axon.

Some of Plonsey's most influential work addressed the electrical properties of the heart, often in collaboration with Roger Barr. They played a role in the development of the bidomain model, a mathematical model of the anisotropic electrical properties of cardiac muscle,

and developed a hypothesis of the mechanism for defibrillation based on the idea that individual cardiac cells are depolarized on one end and hyperpolarized on the other during the shock, sometimes known as the saw-tooth model.

Plonsey also collaborated with Yorum Rudy to calculate the relationship between body surface and epicardial electrical potentials,

and with Frank Witkowski to analyze action potential wave fronts recorded during defibrillation shocks.

Awards

Books 
Plonsey was the author of several books, including:
Principles and Applications of Electromagnetic Fields coauthored with Robert Collin (McGraw-Hill, 1961)
Bioelectric Phenomena (McGraw-Hill, 1969)
Bioelectricity: A Quantitative Approach coauthored with Roger Barr (Springer, 3rd Ed., 2007)
Bioelectromagnetism: Principles and Applications of Bioelectric and Biomagnetic Fields coauthored with Jaakko Malmivuo (Oxford University Press, 1995)

References

External links
Plonsey's website
Duke University's website about Robert Plonsey
IEEE EMBS Obituary of Robert Plonsey

1924 births
2015 deaths
American electrical engineers
Case Western Reserve University faculty
Cooper Union alumni
Duke University faculty
Engineers from New York City
Fellows of the American Association for the Advancement of Science
Fellows of the American Institute for Medical and Biological Engineering
Members of the United States National Academy of Engineering
IEEE Centennial Medal laureates
New York University alumni
University of California, Berkeley alumni